Churchill Water Aerodrome  is located  southeast of Churchill, Manitoba, Canada.

See also
Churchill Airport

References

Water_Aerodrome
Registered aerodromes in Manitoba
Seaplane bases in Manitoba